A histogram is an approximate representation of the distribution of numerical data. The term was first introduced by Karl Pearson.  To construct a histogram, the first step is to "bin" (or "bucket") the range of values—that is, divide the entire range of values into a series of intervals—and then count how many values fall into each interval.  The bins are usually specified as consecutive, non-overlapping intervals of a variable. The bins (intervals) must be adjacent and are often (but not required to be) of equal size.

If the bins are of equal size, a bar is drawn over the bin with height proportional to the frequency—the number of cases in each bin.  A histogram may also be normalized to display "relative" frequencies showing the proportion of cases that fall into each of several categories, with the sum of the heights equaling 1.

However, bins need not be of equal width; in that case, the erected rectangle is defined to have its area proportional to the frequency of cases in the bin. The vertical axis is then not the frequency but frequency density—the number of cases per unit of the variable on the horizontal axis. Examples of variable bin width are displayed on Census bureau data below.

As the adjacent bins leave no gaps, the rectangles of a histogram touch each other to indicate that the original variable is continuous.

Histograms give a rough sense of the density of the underlying distribution of the data, and often for density estimation: estimating the probability density function of the underlying variable. The total area of a histogram used for probability density is always normalized to 1. If the length of the intervals on the x-axis are all 1, then a histogram is identical to a relative frequency plot.

The histogram is one of the seven basic tools of quality control.

Histograms are sometimes confused with bar charts. A histogram is used for continuous data, where the bins represent ranges of data, while a bar chart is a plot of categorical variables. Some authors recommend that bar charts have gaps between the rectangles to clarify the distinction.

A bar graph and a histogram are two common types of graphical representations of data. While they may look similar, there are some key differences between the two that are important to understand.

A bar graph is a chart that uses bars to represent the frequency or quantity of different categories of data. The bars can be either vertical or horizontal, and they are typically arranged either horizontally or vertically to make it easy to compare the different categories. Bar graphs are useful for displaying data that can be divided into discrete categories, such as the number of students in different grade levels at a school.

A histogram, on the other hand, is a graph that shows the distribution of numerical data. It is a type of bar chart that shows the frequency or number of observations within different numerical ranges, called bins. The bins are usually specified as consecutive, non-overlapping intervals of a variable. The histogram provides a visual representation of the distribution of the data, showing the number of observations that fall within each bin. This can be useful for identifying patterns and trends in the data, and for making comparisons between different datasets.

Examples

This is the data for the histogram to the right, using 500 items:

The words used to describe the patterns in a histogram are: "symmetric", "skewed left" or "right", "unimodal", "bimodal" or "multimodal".

It is a good idea to plot the data using several different bin widths to learn more about it. Here is an example on tips given in a restaurant.

The U.S. Census Bureau found that there were 124 million people who work outside of their homes.  Using their data on the time occupied by travel to work, the table below shows the absolute number of people who responded with travel times "at least 30 but less than 35 minutes" is higher than the numbers for the categories above and below it. This is likely due to people rounding their reported journey time. The problem of reporting values as somewhat arbitrarily rounded numbers is a common phenomenon when collecting data from people.

{| class="wikitable" style="text-align:center"
|+Data by absolute numbers
|-
! Interval !! Width !! Quantity !! Quantity/width
|-
| 0 || 5 || 4180 || 836
|-
| 5 || 5 || 13687 || 2737
|-
| 10 || 5 || 18618 || 3723
|-
| 15 || 5 || 19634 || 3926
|-
| 20 || 5 || 17981 ||  3596
|-
| 25 || 5 || 7190 || 1438
|-
| 30 || 5 || 16369 || 3273
|-
| 35 || 5 || 3212 || 642
|-
| 40 || 5 || 4122 || 824
|-
| 45 || 15 || 9200 || 613
|-
| 60 || 30 || 6461 || 215
|-
| 90 || 60 || 3435 || 57
|}

This histogram shows the number of cases per unit interval as the height of each block, so that the area of each block is equal to the number of people in the survey who fall into its category. The area under the curve represents the total number of cases (124 million). This type of histogram shows absolute numbers, with Q in thousands.

{| class="wikitable" style="text-align:center"
|+Data by proportion
|-
! Interval !! Width !! Quantity (Q) !! Q/total/width
|-
| 0 || 5 || 4180 || 0.0067
|-
| 5 || 5 || 13687 || 0.0221
|-
| 10 || 5 || 18618 || 0.0300
|-
| 15 || 5 || 19634 || 0.0316
|-
| 20 || 5 || 17981 || 0.0290
|-
| 25 || 5 || 7190 || 0.0116
|-
| 30 || 5 || 16369 || 0.0264
|-
| 35 || 5 || 3212 || 0.0052
|-
| 40 || 5 || 4122 || 0.0066
|-
| 45 || 15 || 9200 || 0.0049
|-
| 60 || 30 || 6461 || 0.0017
|-
| 90 || 60 || 3435 || 0.0005
|}

This histogram differs from the first only in the vertical scale.  The area of each block is the fraction of the total that each category represents, and the total area of all the bars is equal to 1 (the fraction meaning "all"). The curve displayed is a simple density estimate. This version shows proportions, and is also known as a unit area histogram.

In other words, a histogram represents a frequency distribution by means of rectangles whose widths represent class intervals and whose areas are proportional to the corresponding frequencies: the height of each is the average frequency density for the interval. The intervals are placed together in order to show that the data represented by the histogram, while exclusive, is also contiguous. (E.g., in a histogram it is possible to have two connecting intervals of 10.5–20.5 and 20.5–33.5, but not two connecting intervals of 10.5–20.5 and 22.5–32.5.  Empty intervals are represented as empty and not skipped.)

Mathematical definitions

The data used to construct a histogram are generated via a function mi that counts the number of observations that fall into each of the disjoint categories (known as bins). Thus, if we let n be the total number of observations and k be the total number of bins, the histogram data mi meet the following conditions:

 
A histogram can be thought of as a simplistic kernel density estimation, which uses a kernel to smooth frequencies over the bins. This yields a smoother probability density function, which will in general more accurately reflect distribution of the underlying variable. The density estimate could be plotted as an alternative to the histogram, and is usually drawn as a curve rather than a set of boxes. Histograms are nevertheless preferred in applications, when their statistical properties need to be modeled. The correlated variation of a kernel density estimate is very difficult to describe mathematically, while it is simple for a histogram where each bin varies independently.

An alternative to kernel density estimation is the average shifted histogram,
which is fast to compute and gives a smooth curve estimate of the density without using kernels.

Cumulative histogram
A cumulative histogram is a mapping that counts the cumulative number of observations in all of the bins up to the specified bin. That is, the cumulative histogram Mi of a histogram mj is defined as:

Number of bins and width
There is no "best" number of bins, and different bin sizes can reveal different features of the data.  Grouping data is at least as old as Graunt's work in the 17th century, but no systematic guidelines were given until Sturges' work in 1926.

Using wider bins where the density of the underlying data points is low reduces noise due to sampling randomness; using narrower bins where the density is high (so the signal drowns the noise) gives greater precision to the density estimation.  Thus varying the bin-width within a histogram can be beneficial.  Nonetheless, equal-width bins are widely used.

Some theoreticians have attempted to determine an optimal number of bins, but these methods generally make strong assumptions about the shape of the distribution.  Depending on the actual data distribution and the goals of the analysis, different bin widths may be appropriate, so experimentation is usually needed to determine an appropriate width. There are, however, various useful guidelines and rules of thumb.

The number of bins k can be assigned directly or can be calculated from a suggested bin width h as:

The braces indicate the ceiling function.

Square-root choice 

which takes the square root of the number  of  data  points  in  the  sample (used by Excel's Analysis Toolpak histograms and many other) and rounds to the next integer.

Sturges' formula 

Sturges' formula is derived from a binomial distribution and implicitly assumes an approximately normal distribution.

Sturges' formula implicitly bases bin sizes on the range of the data, and can perform poorly if , because the number of bins will be small—less than seven—and unlikely to show trends in the data well. On the other extreme, Sturges' formula may overestimate bin width for very large datasets, resulting in oversmoothed histograms. It may also perform poorly if the data are not normally distributed.

When compared to Scott's rule and the Terrell-Scott rule, two other widely accepted formulas for histogram bins, the output of Sturges' formula is closest when .

Rice rule 

The Rice Rule  is presented as a simple alternative to Sturges' rule.

Doane's formula 

Doane's formula is a modification of Sturges' formula which attempts to improve its performance with non-normal data.

where  is the estimated 3rd-moment-skewness of the distribution and

Scott's normal reference rule 
Bin width  is given by

where  is the sample standard deviation. Scott's normal reference rule is optimal for random samples of normally distributed data, in the sense that it minimizes the integrated mean squared error of the density estimate.

Freedman–Diaconis' choice 
The Freedman–Diaconis rule gives bin width  as:

which is based on the interquartile range, denoted by IQR. It replaces 3.5σ of Scott's rule with 2 IQR, which is less sensitive than the standard deviation to outliers in data.

Minimizing cross-validation estimated squared error 

This approach of minimizing integrated mean squared error from Scott's rule can be generalized beyond normal distributions, by using leave-one out cross validation:

Here,  is the number of datapoints in the kth bin, and choosing the value of h that minimizes J will minimize integrated mean squared error.

Shimazaki and Shinomoto's choice 

The choice is based on minimization of an estimated L2 risk function

Variable bin widths 

Rather than choosing evenly spaced bins, for some applications it is preferable to vary the bin width. This avoids bins with low counts. A common case is to choose equiprobable bins, where the number of samples in each bin is expected to be approximately equal. The bins may be chosen according to some known distribution or may be chosen based on the data so that each bin has  samples. When plotting the histogram, the frequency density is used for the dependent axis. While all bins have approximately equal area, the heights of the histogram approximate the density distribution.

For equiprobable bins, the following rule for the number of bins is suggested:

This choice of bins is motivated by maximizing the power of a Pearson chi-squared test testing whether the bins do contain equal numbers of samples. More specifically, for a given confidence interval  it is recommended to choose between 1/2 and 1 times the following equation:

Where  is the probit function.

Remark 

Then the histogram remains equally "rugged" as  tends to infinity. If  is the "width" of the distribution (e. g., the standard deviation or the inter-quartile range), then the number of units in a bin (the frequency) is of order  and the relative standard error is of order . Compared to the next bin, the relative change of the frequency is of order  provided that the derivative of the density is non-zero. These two are of the same order if  is of order , so that  is of order . This simple cubic root choice can also be applied to bins with non-constant widths.

Applications 
 In hydrology the histogram and estimated density function of rainfall and river discharge data, analysed with a probability distribution, are used to gain insight in their behaviour and frequency of occurrence. An example is shown in the blue figure.
 In many Digital image processing programs there is an histogram tool, which show you the distribution of the contrast / brightness of the pixels.

See also

 Data and information visualization
 Data binning
 Density estimation
 Kernel density estimation, a smoother but more complex method of density estimation
 Entropy estimation
 Freedman–Diaconis rule
 Image histogram
 Pareto chart
 Seven basic tools of quality
 V-optimal histograms

References

Further reading
 Lancaster, H.O. An Introduction to Medical Statistics. John Wiley and Sons. 1974.

External links

Exploring Histograms, an essay by Aran Lunzer and Amelia McNamara
 Journey To Work and Place Of Work (location of census document cited in example)
 Smooth histogram for signals and images from a few samples
 Histograms: Construction, Analysis and Understanding with external links and an application to particle Physics.
 A Method for Selecting the Bin Size of a Histogram
 Histograms: Theory and Practice, some great illustrations of some of the Bin Width concepts derived above.
 Histograms the Right Way
 Interactive histogram generator
 Matlab function to plot nice histograms
 Dynamic Histogram in MS Excel
 Histogram construction and manipulation using Java applets, and charts on SOCR
 Toolbox for constructing the best histograms

Statistical charts and diagrams
Quality control tools
Estimation of densities
Nonparametric statistics
Statistics articles needing expert attention
Frequency distribution